Merrill Markoe (born August 13, 1948) is an American author, television writer, and occasional  standup comedian.

Early life
Markoe was born in New York City. Her family moved several times including stays in Miami, Florida and San Francisco, California.  She attended the University of California, Berkeley, receiving a B.A. in Art in 1970 and an M.A. in 1972. Her first job after leaving the university was teaching art at the University of Southern California.

Career
After auditing scriptwriting classes and doing research for the head writer of Mary Hartman, Mary Hartman, Markoe was hired as writer for the 1977 revival of Laugh-In, joining a team that included Robin Williams. In 1978, she was part of the cast of Mary Tyler Moore's first attempt at a variety show, the eponymous Mary, along with future boyfriend David Letterman. In 1980, Markoe was the head writer for The David Letterman Show, a short-lived live NBC morning show whose writing team was recognized with a Daytime Emmy Award.

Markoe shared in three Primetime Emmy Awards for Outstanding Writing for a Variety Series for her work on Late Night with David Letterman, for which she was the original head writer. She engineered most of the original concepts and architecture for the ground-breaking late-night talk show and created the segment "Stupid Pet Tricks", as well as  "Stupid Human Tricks" and "Viewer Mail."  Many of the ideas behind the remote segments outside the studio came from Markoe, who also won a Writers Guild award for her writing/performing work on HBO's Not Necessarily the News.

She has also written for television shows such as Newhart, Sex and the City, and Moonlighting.  She appeared on-camera as a lifestyle reporter at KCOP-TV in Los Angeles, then for Michael Moore's NBC show TV Nation, and worked on other magazine shows such as Lifetime Magazine. In the early 1990s she wrote and directed a number of HBO and Cinemax comedy specials. She appeared in two episodes of Space Ghost Coast to Coast from 1997–1998 as the unwilling subject of the eponymous late night talk show host's affections.

In 2005, Markoe was a regular panelist on Animal Planet's Who Gets the Dog? She has had a number of columns and written for many periodicals, including Rolling Stone, Time, New York Woman, New Woman, U.S. News & World Report, Us, People, Esquire, The Huffington Post, Glamour, The New York Times, The Los Angeles Times, LA Weekly, Real Simple, etc.  She appears in episode 2 of Friends as irritable museum curator Marsha and can be seen in the movie EDtv as a panelist, as well as in the cast of The Aristocrats.

In 2020, she was awarded the Laurel Award for TV Writing Achievement by the Writers Guild of America.

Personal life
She and David Letterman were involved romantically from 1978–1988, after which Markoe moved to California to continue her writing career. She wrote about the relationship several years later in essays in the book Cool, Calm, and Contentious, giving him the pseudonym "Bobby".

Markoe lives in Malibu with musician Andy Prieboy and four dogs.

Bibliography

Novels
 It's My F---ing Birthday  (2002)
 The Psycho Ex Game: A Novel (with Andy Prieboy) (2004)
 Walking in Circles Before Lying Down: A Novel (2006)
 Nose Down, Eyes Up: A Novel (2008)

Nonfiction
 Late Night with David Letterman: The Book (with David Letterman) (1985)
 Merrill Markoe's Guide to Love (1997)
 We Saw Scenery: The Early Diaries of Merrill Markoe (2020)

Essay collections
 What the Dogs Have Taught Me: And Other Amazing Things I've Learned (1992)
 How to Be Hap-Hap-Happy Like Me! (1994)
 Cool, Calm & Contentious (2011)

References

External links
 
 

1948 births 
Living people
20th-century American novelists
21st-century American novelists
American columnists
American humorists
Screenwriters from California
American women novelists
Emmy Award winners
University of California, Berkeley alumni
American women screenwriters
University of Southern California faculty
American women columnists
20th-century American women writers
21st-century American women writers
Women humorists
American women non-fiction writers
20th-century American non-fiction writers
21st-century American non-fiction writers
American women academics
20th-century American screenwriters
21st-century American screenwriters